The AA Piedmont District is a high school conference of the Virginia High School League that includes schools from Southwest and Southside Virginia, mostly in the Martinsville and the Danville areas.  The schools of the Piedmont District compete in AA Region IV with the schools in the AA River Ridge District and the AA Southwest District. Until the 1990s, the AA Piedmont District was a member of AA Region III but was moved to balance the number of schools in the VHSL's AA regions. Due to declining school enrollment, Dan River High School became a member of the A Dogwood District beginning in the 2007–08 school year.

The Piedmont District has traditionally been strong in men's basketball, with Martinsville High School having won multiple VHSL Championships. Martinsville High School has won more men's basketball State Championships (a total of 15) than any other school in the Commonwealth of Virginia.

Martinsville High School has won more state championships in the Piedmont District than any other team. Championships include twelve men's basketball state championships, one women's basketball state championship, two football state championships, and two golf state championships.

Tunstall High School has won four state championships in baseball and one state title in wrestling.

Member schools
Bassett High School Bengals of Bassett, VA
George Washington High School Eagles of Danville, VA
Halifax County High School Comets of South Boston, VA
Magna Vista High School Warriors of Ridgeway, VA
Martinsville High School Bulldogs of Martinsville, VA
Patrick County High School Cougars of Stuart, VA
Tunstall High School Trojans of Dry Fork, VA

Mecklenburg County High School (Mascot - Phoenix) will become the newest member of the Piedmont District as of July 1, 2022. Mecklenburg County is the consolidation of Bluestone and Park View-South Hill High Schools.

Virginia High School League